Acoustics is the interdisciplinary science that deals with the study of all mechanical waves in gases, liquids, and solids.

Acoustics may also refer to:
 Acoustics (Tony Rice album) (1979)
 Acoustics (Floater album) (2004)
 Acoustics (Minus the Bear EP) (2008)
 Acoustics (Lydia EP) (2012)
 Acoustics (This Century EP) (2012)

See also
 Acoustic (disambiguation)
 Musical acoustics